Plainville is a town in Hartford County, Connecticut, United States. The population was 17,525 at the 2020 census.

History
Plainville first was inhabited by Europeans around 1650. By the 1660s, the land was incorporated as land for nearby Farmington. In the year 1869, it separated from Farmington due to the distance of the town center and the growth of Plainville downtown due to the installation of the New York, New Haven and Hartford Railroad and the Hartford, Providence, and Fishkill Railroad.

Geography
The east side of the town is bordered by two prominent peaks of the Metacomet Ridge: Pinnacle Rock and Bradley Mountain. The  Metacomet Trail traverses those peaks.

Demographics

As of the census of 2020, there were 17,525 people, 8,187 households, and 4,565 families residing in the town. The racial makeup of the town was 87.1% White, 1.7% Black or African American, 0.9% Native American, 4.0% Asian, 0.00% Pacific Islander, and 1.3% from two or more races. Hispanic or Latino of any race were 10.3% of the population.

There were 8,187 households, out of which 60.1% were married couples living together, 13.5% had a female householder with no husband present, 5.8% had a male householder with no wife present, and 20.7% were non-families, such as single person households. The average household size was 2.32 and the average family size was 2.97.

In the town, the population was spread out, with 19.8% under the age of 19, 6.0% from 20 to 24, 25.9% from 25 to 44, 29.1% from 45 to 64, and 19.2% who were 65 years of age or older. The median age was 43.8 years. For every 100 males, there were 106.8 females.

The median income for a household in the town was $70,012. The per capita income for the town was $40,869. About 6.2% of the population were below the poverty line, including 10.0% of those under age 18 and 8.0% of those age 65 or over.

The median home value was $219,700 and median rent was $1,027. 68.0% of the population own, while 32.0% rent. About 61.0% of housing structures were single unit, 38.0% were multi-unit, and 1.0% were other, such as mobile homes.

Economy

There were approximately 2,007 active businesses in Plainville as of 2021. Key employers includes, Wheeler Clinic, Manafort Bros. Construction, Gems Sensors & Controls, Tilcon Connecticut, and Americold. Major industries are health care, manufacturing, construction, and retail. 

The Town of Plainville is one of the only municipalities to own its own airport, Robertson Field.

Arts and culture
Plainville holds an annual Hot Air Balloon Festival at the end of August at Norton Park, gathering many of the townspeople together for fun-filled nights of games, music, and fireworks. The event is sponsored by the Plainville Fire Company. 

Plainville hosts an annual PumpkinFest in October. This event is a downtown, outdoor festival featuring live music, a kid's costume parade, games, a large variety of food trucks, a haunted house, and many local vendors, downtown restaurants, and businesses.

In June at Robertson Field, the airport hosts the annual Plainville Wings & Wheels fly-in and car show. This event supports the Petit Family Foundation and the Plainville Community Food Pantry. 

Plainville has also been something of a minor transportation hub. In the nineteenth century, Plainville was served by the Farmington Canal. It also sits on the intersection of two rail lines, one running north from New Haven and the other running east–west between Waterbury and Berlin. Finally, Plainville is the home of Robertson Field, the oldest private airport in Connecticut.

Education
Plainville has three elementary schools: Louis Toffolon School, Frank T. Wheeler School, and Linden Street School.

There is one middle school, the Middle School of Plainville, which serves grades 6 to 8. The middle school adopts the same mascot and colors as the town high school.

Plainville High School is the only town high school. The school mascot is the Blue Devil, and the colors are blue and white, same as nearby Central Connecticut State University.  The baseball team has a rich tradition, with another state title log inwon in 2012. The Plainville High School cheer team are Central Connecticut Conference Grand Champions, having won the title in 2017, 2018, 2019, 2020, & 2022. They were CIAC co-ed champions in 2019 and placed top 3 in New England in 2022.

Government
Plainville is run by a Town Manager/Town Council form of government. Michael Paulhus is the current town manager (as of 2022). The Town Council comprises seven members elected every two years. The Municipal Center is located at 1 Central Square near the center of town.

Notable people

 John Bello (born 1946), founder and former CEO of SoBe; president of NFL Properties
 Ted Christopher (1958–2017), former NASCAR driver, known for his participation on the Whelen Modified Tour
 Pauline R. Kezer (born 1942), former Secretary of the State of Connecticut
 Niko Koutouvides (born 1981), former NFL linebacker
 John Harper Trumbull (1873–1961), 70th governor of Connecticut

References

External links
 Town of Plainville official website
 Plainville Community Schools

 
Towns in Connecticut
Towns in Hartford County, Connecticut
Greater Hartford